

About

Tadapatla Ratna Bai, a politician from Indian National Congress party is a Member of the Parliament of India representing Andhra Pradesh in the Rajya Sabha, the Council of States, the upper house of the Indian Parliament. She has been an active member since her election into the house rising concerns ranging from dowry deaths to Science and Technology.

While she served as the Chairperson of the Girijan Co-Operative Corporation from 2005 to 2007, she was instrumental in reviving the almost obsolete corporation to an operative status. She succeeded in persuading the then Chief Minister of Andhra Pradesh, Dr. Y. S. Rajasekhara Reddy to permit GCC to be exempted from VAT, benefiting 4.5 million Girijan families. She is also Founder President of Rajiv Gandhi Sankshema Sangam, Rampachodavaram, a non-profit organization aimed at tribal welfare.

She served as a Member of the Andhra Pradesh Legislative Assembly from Yellavaram constituency from 1972 to 1978.

Offices held
 April 2008 Elected to Rajya Sabha
 August 2008 – May 2009 Member, Committee on Rural Development
 August 2008 – May 2009 and September 2009 onwards Member, Consultative Committee for the Ministry of Tribal Affairs
 August 2009 onwards Member, Committee on Food, Consumer Affairs and Public Distribution March
 2010 onwards Member, Marine Products Export Development Authority (MPEDA)
 1972–78 Member, Andhra Pradesh Legislative Assembly

Notes

External links
 Profile on Rajya Sabha website

Indian National Congress politicians from Andhra Pradesh
1946 births
Telugu politicians
Osmania University alumni
Living people
Rajya Sabha members from Andhra Pradesh
Members of the Andhra Pradesh Legislative Assembly
Women members of the Andhra Pradesh Legislative Assembly
People from East Godavari district
21st-century Indian women politicians
21st-century Indian politicians
Women members of the Rajya Sabha